Finland competed at the 2002 Winter Paralympics in Salt Lake City, United States. 14 competitors from Finland won 8 medals, including 4 gold, 1 silver and 3 bronze and finished 9th in the medal table.

See also 
 Finland at the Paralympics
 Finland at the 2002 Winter Olympics

References 

2002
2002 in Finnish sport
Nations at the 2002 Winter Paralympics